Ariocarpus bravoanus is a species of cactus which is endemic to San Luis Potosí in Mexico. It grows in dry shrubland habitat on limestone substrates. It is endangered due to overcollecting.

References

External links

Bravoanus
Cacti of Mexico
Endemic flora of Mexico
Flora of San Luis Potosí
Endangered biota of Mexico
Endangered flora of North America
Taxonomy articles created by Polbot